Henutmire was an ancient Egyptian princess and queen. She was one of the eight Great Royal Wives of Pharaoh Ramesses II of the 19th Dynasty of Egypt.

Life
She is supposedly the third and youngest child of Seti I and Tuya, and the younger sister of Ramesses II and Tia. This theory is based on a statue of Queen Tuya, now in the Vatican. The statue shows Tuya with Henutmire, thus it is assumed that they were mother and daughter. However, she is nowhere mentioned as "King's Sister", a title which Princess Tia used, thus it is unclear whether she was a younger sister or a daughter of Ramesses.

Her name means "The lady is like Rê". She married Ramesses II and became Great Royal Wife; if she was his daughter, she was the fourth to do so, after Bintanath, Meritamen and Nebettawy. She is shown on statues of Ramesses from Abukir and Heliopolis. On a colossus from Hermopolis she is depicted together with Princess-Queen Bintanath. Both have the titles The Hereditary Princess, richly favoured, Mistress of the South and the North, King's Daughter, Great Royal Wife.

Death and burial
She died around Ramesses' 40th regnal year, and was buried in the tomb QV75. Her tomb was robbed already in antiquity; the trough of her coffin was later used for the burial of priest-king Harsiese in Medinet Habu. It is now in the Egyptian Museum in Cairo.

Sources

External links
 Queen Henutmire

13th-century BC Egyptian women
Wives of Ramesses II
Seti I
Princesses of the Nineteenth Dynasty of Egypt